Claude Noisette de Crauzat is a contemporary French musicologist, specializing in the study of works for pipe organ.

Biography 
Claude Noisette de Crauzat is the author of numerous books on the organ and has directed several theses of musicology. He also published recordings of works by Jean-Philippe Rameau.

Publications

Notables works 
 L'orgue de la cathédrale de Bayeux, Caen, Art de Basse-Normandie No 59, 1972, 38 pages .
 L'orgue en Bretagne sous l'ancien régime, doctoral thesis, directed by Jacques Chailley (Université Paris-Sorbonne) 1973, 4 vols. 880 pages} .
 Connaître Rouen, La Musique à Rouen, Jehan Titelouze, with Max Pinchard, Rouen, Lecerf, 1976. 
 L'orgue dans la société française, photographs by Jean-Paul Dumontier, Paris, series "Musique, musicologie" No 6, H. Champion, 1979 . 
 Cavaillé-Coll, photographs by Jean-Paul Dumontier, Paris, la Flûte de Pan, 1984, 464 pages . 
 L'Orgue français, photographs by Jean-Paul Dumontier, Paris, Éditions Atlas, 1986 .

Other works 
  De la virtuosité dans l'orgue français au XIXème siècle : Lefebure-Wely, 1987. Article on Persée
 Les Dialogues des Carmélites: Opéra de Francis Poulenc d’après un texte de Georges Bernanos, thesis of musicology by Marie-Paule Courboulin, directed by Claude Noisette de Crauzat, 1988. 
 Les orgues néoclassiques en Normandie: études de la facture instrumentale et de l'écriture musicale, études historiques et analyses techniques de quelques instruments normands, thesis of musicology by Isabelle Grévrend, directed by Claude Noisette de Crauzat, Rouen, 2006. 
 La vie musicale en Seine-Inférieure pendant la seconde guerre mondiale, thesis of musicology by Bénédicte Percheron, directed by Claude Noisette de Crauzat, Rouen, 2007. 
 La manufacture d'orgues Krischer, thesis of musicology by Marie-Astrid Normand, directed by Frédéric Billiet, Sorbonne, 2011.

Discographic notes 
 Robert Veyron-Lacroix plays Jean-Philippe Rameau, World Record Club, The Record Society, 1971.
 Robert Veyron-Lacroix interprète Rameau, harpsichord Hemsch 1755-1756 (LP Erato Records) .
 Robert Veyron-Lacroix, Rameau: Selected Harpsichord Works (LP Musical Heritage Society, 1972) .
 Jean-Patrice Brosse, Premier Livre d'orgue by Nicolas Lebègue (July 1981, Arion ARN268561) .
 ''Pierre Cochereau, aux grandes orgues de Notre-Dame de Paris : Bach, Franck, Boellmann, Widor, Vierne, Messiaen, Cochereau (1965/1973, Philips 412 704-2)

References

External links 

20th-century French musicologists
21st-century French musicologists
Living people
Year of birth missing (living people)